Norway first participated at the Summer Olympics in 1900, and has sent athletes to compete in every Games since then, except for the 1980 Summer Olympics in Moscow when they participated in the American-led boycott and, as previously thought, the 1904 Games in St. Louis, United States. However, at the beginning of the 21st century, it was discovered that wrestlers Charles Ericksen and Bernhoff Hansen, who were Norwegian expatriates in America whose medals at the 1904 Summer Olympics were previously attributed to United States, still held Norwegian citizenship at the time of the games. They won the gold medals in the wrestling welterweight and heavyweight events respectively.

Norwegian athletes have won a total of 160 medals at the Summer Olympics, with sailing and shooting as the top medal-producing sports. At the Winter Olympic Games, Norway has won 405 total medals including 148 gold medals, both considerably more than any other nation in Winter Olympic history. More than half of these medals have come from cross-country skiing and speed skating. Norway is one of only three nations (along with Austria and Liechtenstein) to have won more medals at the Winter Games than at the Summer Games.

The National Olympic Committee for Norway was created and recognized in 1900.

1904 Summer Olympics
The International Olympic Committee considers Norwegian-American wrestlers Charles Ericksen and Bernhoff Hansen to have competed for the United States (both were Norwegian immigrants to the US); each won a gold medal. In 2012, Norwegian historians however found documentation showing that Ericksen did not receive American citizenship until March 22, 1905, and that Hansen, who was registered as an "alien" (foreigner) as late as 1925, probably never received American citizenship. The historians have therefore petitioned to have the athletes registered as Norwegians.
In May 2013 it was reported that the Norwegian Olympic Committee had filed a formal application for changing the nationality of the wrestlers in IOC's medal database. In July 2021, the IOC modified data in the official database, recognizing Ericksen and Hansen as having competed for Norway.

Hosted Games
Norway has hosted the Games on two occasions.

Medal tables

*Red border color indicates tournament was held on home soil.

Medals by Summer Games

Medals by Winter Games

Records
The most gold and total medals in the history of the Winter Olympics (148 and 405)
The most gold medals won in a single Winter Olympics (16 in 2022)
The most total medals won in a single Winter Olympics (39 in 2018)

Medals by summer sport

*This table does not include three medals – two silver and one bronze – awarded in the figure skating events at the 1920 Summer Olympics.

Medals by winter sport

*This table includes three medals – two silver and one bronze – awarded in the figure skating events at the 1920 Summer Olympics.

Summary by sport

Athletics
Norway's Olympic debut in 1900 included two track and field athletes; Carl Albert Andersen won a bronze medal in the pole vault.

Sailing
Norway made its sailing debut in 1908.

Shooting
Norway made its shooting debut in 1900. Ole Østmo earned medals in two of the free rifle positions, contributing to an individual three-position bronze and a team silver.

See also
 List of flag bearers for Norway at the Olympics
 :Category:Olympic competitors for Norway
 Norway at the Paralympics

References

External links